Parker Township is the name of some places in the U.S. state of Minnesota:
Parker Township, Marshall County, Minnesota
Parker Township, Morrison County, Minnesota

Minnesota township disambiguation pages